The Mitsubishi 1MT was a Japanese single-seat triplane torpedo bomber built by Mitsubishi for the Imperial Japanese Navy Air Service. Designed by the former Sopwith designer Herbert Smith it was intended for use aboard the Japanese aircraft carrier .

The 1MT1N flew for the first time in August 1922 and it entered service as the Navy Type 10 Torpedo Bomber or Carrier Attacker. 20 aircraft were built, but the aircraft was difficult to fly and unable to operate from an aircraft carrier when carrying a torpedo. The type was soon withdrawn and scrapped.

Operators

Imperial Japanese Navy Air Service

Specifications (1MT1N)

See also

References

1MT, Mitsubishi
1MT
Triplanes
Carrier-based aircraft
Single-engined tractor aircraft
Aircraft first flown in 1922